Odo Rumpf (born 3 April 1961 in Leverkusen) is a German sculptor working in Cologne.

Life
After completing his studies of mechanical engineering at the RWTH Aachen, Rumpf studied with the German artist  for two years and has been working full-time as an artist since 1991.

Odo Rumpf creates sculptures from industrial finds, large kinetic objects, spatial installations and media sculptures.

Odonien

The site is also used by other international artists. Decorated with metal sculptures,  hosts exhibitions, festivals as well as music, cinematic and dance events. The site and beer garden is also available to rent for events by third parties.  is home to the semi-annual robot show "". The nightly fleamarket  is also situated there. Since 2020,  also hosts the inclusive RoboLAB festival.

Exhibitions

An incomplete list of exhibitions:

 1991 , Aachen, Germany
 1992 Kunstverein Spektrum (exhibition "Moderne"), Leverkusen, Cologne, Germany
 1993 Gallery Art 54 (exhibition "Strangers"), New York, USA
 1994 ambiente 94, Designmesse, Ursuliniensäle, Innsbruck, Austria
 1997 Turmart 97, Geldern, Germany
 1998 Botanischer Garten Köln (with J. Röderer & V. Kiehn), Cologne, Germany
 1999 ifficial art cologne, Cologne, Germany
 2000 1. Kunstmeile, Oberhausen, Germany
 2001 1. Art-Symposium, Algoz, Portugal
 2002 Landesgartenschau, Monheim am Rhein, Germany
 2003 Friedrich-Ebert-Stiftung, Yaoundé, Kamerun
 2004 Landesgartenschau, Trier, Germany
 2005 Landesgartenschau, Leverkusen, Cologne, Germany
 2005 Kulturinstitut, Gallery Phönix, Moscow, Russia
 2006 Centro Espositivo Rocca Paolina, Perugia, Italia

Sculptures in public space

An incomplete list of sculptures in public space:

 1993 "Drachenflügel" (dragon wings), Wasserturm, Stadt Geldern, Germany
 1994 "hydro maszina", Großklärwerk Cologne-Stammheim, Germany
 1999 "Solarvogel" (solar bird), Rheinpromenade Cologne, Germany
 2001 Großskulpturen "Baustelle A", Businesspark Niederrhein, Germany
 2001 "Orpheus", Anatomisches Institut der Uniklinik Köln, Cologne, Germany
 2002 Skulpturenenvironment "Archos Palingenius", Stadt Monheim, Germany
 2017 "Slinky",  in Weil am Rhein, Germany

Awards 
A selection of awards:

 1992 designs fiction, Impuls Design Förderung Berlin, Herbstmesse Frankfurt, Germany
 1995 Lev-Kunst-95, Forum Leverkusen, Cologne, Germany
 1997 Europäischer Solarpreis Kunst 1997 von Eurosolar e.V.
 1999 Palais Allegria, Beaulieu sur Mér, France

See also 
 Burning Man
 
 Kinetic art
 Robotic art
 Rube Goldberg machine
 Sound art

References

Further reading

External links 

 http://www.odorumpf.de/ Website of Odo Rumpf
 http://www.odonien.de/ Atelier site 
 https://www.robodonien.de/  festival site
 https://robolab.online/ RoboLAB festival site
 https://www.bazardenuit.de/  site

German male sculptors
20th-century German sculptors
21st-century German sculptors
1961 births
Living people